Grzegorz Bernard Napieralski (pronounced ; born March 18, 1974) is a Polish left-wing politician. He is an MP (member of the Sejm) and was chairman of the Democratic Left Alliance (SLD) from 2008 to 2011.

Education and political career
Napieralski was born in Szczecin in 1974. After graduating from mechanics school in Szczecin, Napieralski studied Political Science at the University of Szczecin, obtaining his master's degree in 2000. From 1995 to 1999 he was the secretary of Szczecin division of Social Democracy of the Republic of Poland, which later became the Democratic Left Alliance. In 2002 he became the aide to the Voivode in West Pomeranian Voivodeship. In 2004, he was elected to Sejm, taking the place of Bogusław Liberadzki, who became a member of the European Parliament. Napieralski was subsequently elected again in 2005, 2007 and 2011.

In 2004 Napieralski became the vice-chairman of the SLD and a year later its secretary general. On May 31, 2008, he was chosen the new chairman of the Democratic Left Alliance, defeating Wojciech Olejniczak. From 2009 to 2011 he was also chairman of the Lewica parliamentary fraction.

On April 22, 2010, the Democratic Left Alliance chose Napieralski to replace Jerzy Szmajdziński, who had died in a plane crash, as its candidate in the upcoming presidential election. Napieralski finished third, receiving 13.68% of the votes, and did not advance to the second round of the election.

On December 10, 2011, in the wake of what was perceived to be his party's electoral failure, he was succeeded by Leszek Miller as the party chairman.

On January 9, 2015, he was suspended from the SLD. He decided, however, that the decision was illegal, and sued the chairman of the party in a court of law. On March 30 the same year he was suspended by the court party for three years in performing party. On June 22 has been hung up by the court party. Five days later, however, occurred with the Democratic Left Alliance. On June 29 he joined The Whites and Reds party.

Political positions
Napieralski calls for withdrawing Polish troops from Afghanistan as quickly as possible. He also supports more progressive taxation. He is in favor of liberalizing the abortion law in Poland and of government reimbursement of in vitro fertilization and contraception. He supports same sex civil unions, although he opposes adoption of children by such pairs. He is a supporter of separation of church and state and criticizes the Catholic Church's privileged position in Poland.

Personal life

He is married to Małgorzata Napieralska (née Juras) and has two daughters, Alicja and Aleksandra.

See also
 Members of Polish Sejm 2005-2007

References

External links
Official site
Grzegorz Napieralski - parliamentary page - includes declarations of interest, voting record, and transcripts of speeches.
Gazeta Wyborcza on Napieralski during President Obama's visit to Poland   - the largest national daily comments on the odd behaviour of the leader of a third largest political party during an official state visit of a foreign head of state.

1974 births
Living people
Politicians from Szczecin
University of Szczecin alumni
Members of the Polish Sejm 2001–2005
Members of the Polish Sejm 2005–2007
Members of the Polish Sejm 2007–2011
Members of the Polish Sejm 2011–2015
Members of the Senate of Poland 2015–2019
Democratic Left Alliance politicians
Members of the Polish Sejm 2019–2023
Candidates in the 2010 Polish presidential election
Polish atheists
Polish Initiative